Congrhynchus talabonoides is a species of eel in the family Congridae. It is the only member of its genus. It is only found in the Pacific Ocean near the Philippines at depths of 247–393 meters.

References

Congridae
Fish described in 1934